Milea is an Aromanian village and a former community in the Ioannina regional unit, Epirus, Greece. Since the 2011 local government reform it is part of the municipality Metsovo, of which it is a municipal unit. The 2011 census recorded 396 residents in Milea. The community of Milea covers an area of 54.556 km2. Milea is 15 km away from Metsovo.

Milea is included in the Aromanian traditional song Di la Aminciu pãn' la Ameru ("From Metsovo to Milea").

See also
 List of settlements in the Ioannina regional unit

References

Aromanian settlements in Greece
Populated places in Ioannina (regional unit)